Stephen Christopher Corica ( born 24 March 1973) is an Australian association football manager and former player suffering from short man syndrome. He is the current manager of Australian club Sydney FC.

A technically gifted and skillful attacking midfielder during his playing career, he represented Australia more than thirty times and captained Sydney FC to a domestic double. Since retiring in 2010, he was an assistant and youth coach at Sydney FC, before being appointed Head Coach in May 2018. During his managing tenure, Corica has won one A-League premiership and two championships, well known for his tactical inflexibility and an absurd reliance on the past glories of others.

Club career

Early career 
Corica started playing football in his home town of Innisfail, in Far North Queensland and joining the elite player program at the Australian Institute of Sport in 1990.

Marconi Stallions 
On completion of the scholarship he signed with Marconi-Fairfield in the now defunct National Soccer League.  In his first NSL season he made just three starts, but developed to a regular selection in following years.  In 1992/93 he helped Marconi to a grand final win and was named Under 21 Player of the Year. The next two years were less successful for the Marconi and in 1995, Corica sought a career move to Europe.

England (Leicester City and Wolves) 
Corica signed with Leicester City in the English First Division (now the EFL Championship).  He debuted for the club on 12 August 1995 and scored in a 2–1 win. Adding to his tally was harder to come by for following games, and in February, Corica and fellow Australian Zeljko Kalac were signed by their former Leicester manager Mark McGhee for Wolverhampton Wanderers in a joint £1.75 million deal (the component for Corica was £1.1m). Kalac was unable to gain a work permit for Wolves and returned to Australia, but Corica remained.  In four-and-a-half seasons at Wolves, Corica made over 100 appearances, although hampered by a series of knee injuries.

Sanfrecce Hiroshima 
Corica left Wolves in 2000, moving to Japan with J1 League side Sanfrecce Hiroshima for two seasons, then returning to England at Walsall. In September 2004, unable to work his way into the first team, Walsall agreed to release him.

Sydney FC 

He finally decided to return home to Australia after spending 10 years abroad, joining new A-League club Sydney FC.  It was a shaky start to the new competition for Corica, sent off in Sydney's third A-League match against Newcastle for a dangerous foul. After serving a one match suspension, he repaid the club scoring just five minutes in against Queensland Roar, and following up with a second goal later in the match.  Corica retained a place in the side for much of the year as Sydney progressed to the Grand Final.  A set-up from Dwight Yorke in the second half, gave Corica the only goal in Sydney FC's 1–0 victory over the Central Coast Mariners to help the team win the inaugural A-League Championship.

He remained with the club in 2006/07 and 2007/08 seasons, playing a key role in Sydney's 2007 Asian Champions League campaign, scoring four goals in six matches. On 1 April 2008 he signed a 1-year contract to remain at Sydney, and given his age is possible he will retire afterward. Corica had a great start to the 2008–09 A-League Season after scoring a double in the Round 2 match against Central Coast Mariners. He became Sydney's highest goalscorer after overtaking Sasho Petrovski's former record of 14, with a Penalty in Sydney's 5–2 thrashing of Perth Glory. He became Sydney's 3rd player to reach 100 professional games for the club, with their 2–1 loss to Perth Glory on 19 November 2008 at Members Equity Stadium. On 11 February 2010 he announced his retirement at the end of the season.

On the final day of the regular season in the 2009/10 season against Melbourne Victory, Corica limped off in the 20th minute due to hamstring problems. Sydney went on to win the game 2–0 and claimed the Premiership. After later examination of his injury, it was discovered that he had torn his hamstring muscle off the bone and required surgery thus ending his season. He then announced his full retirement from professional football.

International career 
Corica has represented Australia at all youth (U17, U20, U23) and at national team level, the first Australian to achieve the feat.

He represented Australia at the FIFA U-17 World Championship in Scotland in 1989. Although his team finished last in a very tough group, he did have his moments, such as scoring against Brazil in a 3–1 loss. In 1991, he was selected for the FIFA World Youth Championship in Portugal, where Australia performed remarkably well and reached the semi finals before losing to the hosts. He then went on to play in two Olympic Games football tournament, the first being the 1992 Olympics in Barcelona, where Australia made another impressive run to the semi finals, this time falling to Poland at the penultimate stage. Four years later, he was part of the 1996 Olympics team in Atlanta. He was part of a generation of Australian players (including Paul Okon, Ned Zelic, Mark Bosnich and Zeljko Kalac) dubbed the "Golden Generation".

On 16 April 1993 Corica was given his full national team debut by Eddie Thomson (former national coach) against Kuwait in a friendly match in Singapore. He then went on to play for the national team, earning over 40 caps (some in non-'A' internationals) and scoring 6 goals including appearances at the 1997 and 2001 Confederations Cups. After a five-year absence from the national team, he appeared in an Asia Cup qualifier against Kuwait on 16 August 2006 as one of eight Sydney FC players called up to the national team.

Managerial career 
Corica took over as coach for the Sydney FC National Youth League team from the 2010–11 season.

It was announced in July 2011, that Corica would become one of two Assistant Coaches to Manager Vitezslav Lavicka, along with Ian Crook, who was the assistant coach at Sydney FC, under Pierre Littbarski during Sydney FC's Inaugural season, in which they won the 2005–06 Championship.

In 2012, Corica acted as caretaker coach of Sydney FC, after the resignation of Ian Crook and until the hiring of replacement Frank Farina.

In the 2013–14 season Corica became Head Coach of the Sydney FC National Youth League once again guiding them to the Championship in a stellar season. He continued in this role in 2014–15 but towards the end of the NYL season in which Sydney FC finished fourth he was drafted into the role of Assistant Coach to Graham Arnold with the Sydney FC A-League team where they finished runners up in the Premiership and Grand Final. From 2015 to May 2018, Corica continued as the Assistant Coach to Graham Arnold on a full-time basis.

On 16 May 2018, following Graham Arnold's appointment by the Australian national team, Corica was appointed the Head Coach of Sydney FC's senior team.

His first season coaching the Sydney FC club was a success, with Sydney FC winning the 2019 A-League Grand Final. During that match, Corica was given a yellow card due to arguing with the referee.

Career statistics

Club

National team

International goals

Managerial statistics

Honours

Player 
With Australia:
 OFC Nations Cup: 2000
With Sydney FC:
 A-League Premiership: 2009–10
 A-League Championship: 2006, 2010
 Oceania Club Championship: 2004–05
With Marconi-Fairfield:
 NSL Championship: 1992–1993

Individual
 Sydney FC Member's Player of the Year: 2006–07, 2007–08
 NSL Papasavas Medal (U-21): 1992–93
 PFA A-League Team of the Decade: 2005–2015
 Sydney FC Hall of Fame: 2015

Honourable distinctions
 First A-League Finals goalscorer: Sydney FC v Adelaide United – 12 February 2006
 First A-League Grand Final goalscorer: Sydney FC v Central Coast Mariners – 5 March 2006
 First AFC Champions League goalscorer: Sydney FC v Shanghai Shenhua – 7 March 2007

Manager

Club 
Sydney FC
A-League Premiership: 2019–20
A-League Championship: 2019, 2020

References

External links 

 Sydney FC profile
 Oz Football profile

1973 births
Living people
Australian people of Italian descent
Association football midfielders
Australian soccer players
Australian expatriate soccer players
Australia international soccer players
Olympic soccer players of Australia
Leicester City F.C. players
Wolverhampton Wanderers F.C. players
Sanfrecce Hiroshima players
J1 League players
Walsall F.C. players
Sydney FC managers
Sydney FC players
Australian people of Sicilian descent
A-League Men players
English Football League players
Marconi Stallions FC players
National Soccer League (Australia) players
Expatriate footballers in England
Expatriate footballers in Japan
Australian expatriate sportspeople in England
Australian expatriate sportspeople in Japan
People from Innisfail, Queensland
Australian Institute of Sport soccer players
Australian soccer coaches
Footballers at the 1992 Summer Olympics
Footballers at the 1996 Summer Olympics
2000 OFC Nations Cup players
2001 FIFA Confederations Cup players
Association football coaches